= Clown Song =

Single by P-Control
- Released: 2002
- Length: 3:38
- Label: Iceberg Records
- Songwriters: Mads B.B. Krog, P-Control, Ditlev Hjorth
- Producers: Mads B.B. Krog, P-Control

"Clown Song" (styled as "Clown-Song") is the debut and only single by Danish artist, P-Control. The song was released in 2002 and peaked at number 8 in Denmark and 43 in Australia.

== Track listings ==
Danish single

1. "Clown Song" (Radio "Censored" mix) - 3:38
2. "Clown Song" (Electronic Radio mix) - 3:00
3. "Clown Song" (M. F. Radio edit) - 3:38
4. "Clown Song" (Club "Censored") - 5:08
5. "Clown Song" (Mother F.... Club mix) - 5:10
6. "Clown Song" (Electronic remix) - 4:55

Australian single

1. "Clown Song" (Video Mix) - 3:39
2. "Clown Song" (Sunburner Remix [Edit]) - 3:46
3. "Clown Song" (Sunburner Remix) - 7:51
4. "Clown Song" (Electronic Remix) - 4:55

== Charts ==
Chart (2002/03)	Peak position
Australia (ARIA)	20
Denmark (Tracklisten)	8
